Weenie Beenie was a chain of fast food restaurants, which is now reduced to one location.  Weenie Beenie predominantly sells half-smokes, hot dogs, pulled pork sandwiches, and soft drinks.

Weenie Beenie was founded by Carl and Bill Staton in Arlington, Virginia in 1950.  Bill Staton, a billiards player, used money from his pool playing to fund the restaurants, which numbered six at one time.  Bill Staton was also known by the nickname "Weenie Beenie".  The final Weenie Beenie is the original location, in the Shirlington section of Arlington.   It is now particularly well known for its half-smokes.

Dave Grohl, frontman for the band Foo Fighters and a former DC area resident who also lived in the Del Ray area of Alexandria, Virginia, titled a song on the Foo Fighters' first album "Weenie Beenie" after the restaurant.

See also

 List of hot dog restaurants

References

External links 

1950 establishments in Virginia
American companies established in 1950
Buildings and structures in Arlington County, Virginia
Defunct restaurant chains in the United States
Hot dog restaurants in the United States
Restaurants established in 1950
Restaurants in Virginia